INS Keshet is an Israeli missile boat, one of ten s. She was launched in 1982 by Israel Shipyards at the Port of Haifa. She has been a part of Israeli Navy since November 1982.

Construction 
New ships were longer and consequently they take an augmented armament.

INS Keshet was built at the Israel Shipyards in Port of Haifa. She was launched in October 1982.

Dimensions and drive 
She has a flush deck, short superstructure located in front of the midship and freeboard. The full load displacement is 488 tonnes.

Keshet is proppeled by four MTU 16V538 TB93 Diesel engines.

Armament 

The primary armament is two quadruple launchers of American Harpoon anti-ship missiles, both allocated behind the superstructure.

The secondary armament consists of single, dual purpose gun OTO Melara 76 mm, allocated abaft in a gun turret. The angle of elevation is 85°. The bow is armed with close-in weapon system, Phalanx CIWS, with the rate of fire 3,000 RPM, and the range .

References 

1982 ships
Ships built in Israel
Sa'ar 4.5-class missile boats
Naval ships of Israel
Missile boats of the Israeli Navy